UDP-glucuronic acid decarboxylase 1 is an enzyme that in humans is encoded by the UXS1 gene.

UDP-glucuronate decarboxylase (UGD; EC 4.1.1.35) catalyzes the formation of UDP-xylose from UDP-glucuronate. UDP-xylose is then used to initiate glycosaminoglycan biosynthesis on the core protein of proteoglycans.[supplied by OMIM]

See also
Carboxy-lyases
Golgi apparatus
Tetrameric protein
Uridine diphosphate (UDP)

References

Further reading